Sheelasha Rajbhandari, (शिलाशा राजभण्डारी) is a Nepali visual artist and cultural organizer who was born in 1988 in Kathmandu. She completed her MFA from Tribuvan University in 2014. Her work examines alternative narratives through folk tales, oral traditions, myths, material culture, performances and rituals, and presents them as counterpoints to mainstream history and narratives. She often seeks to challenge social taboos and patriarchal discourses by focusing on women's struggles and celebrating their resilience. Her long-term research plans and artistic practice often synthesize knowledge and experiences gained as a result of individual and collective discourses. Rajbhandari is also a curator noted for her contributions to the Kathmandu Triennale 2077 and first Nepal Pavilion, at the 59th International Art Exhibition – La Biennale di Venezia in 2022. In 2013, she co-founded the art collective Artree Nepal alongside Hit Man Gurung, Subas Tamang, Mekh Limbu, and Lavkant Chaudhary.

Work & Career 
Engaged in women's experiences, Rajbhandari's practice seeks to counter how women's agency and physicality are becoming contested political sites for contemporary nation-states. Her recent works also examine the transformation of Nepal's current transformation from a major center of Himalayan trade to a geopolitical situation between two emerging world powers, India and China.

Exhibitions 
Her installation in the traveling exhibition “A  beast, a god and a line” (2018–2020) has been presented at Para Site, Hong Kong; TS1, Yangon; Museum of Modern Art, Warsaw; Kunsthall, Trondheim; and MAIIAM Contemporary Art Museum, Chiang Mai. She has also been an artist in residence at the Bellas Artes Projects (2019) and Para Site (2017). She has furthermore exhibited at Museum of Arts and Design, New York (2022), Weltmuseum Wien (2019); Serendipity Arts Festival, Goa (2017); and Kathmandu Triennale (2017). As a part of her collective she has been a part of Dhaka Art Summit (2020) and Biennale of Sydney (2020).

Collections 
Rajbhandari's art is represented in private and institutional collections such as 
 Kadist
 Samdani Art Foundation
 Weltmuseum Wien

References 

1988 births
Living people
Nepalese artists
Tribhuvan University alumni
Nepali curators
Nepali women curators